Karate at the 2017 Summer Deaflympics in Samsun was held from 24 to 26 July 2017 at the Atatürk Sports Hall in Canik.

Medal summary

Medalists

Men

Women

See also
 Karate at the 2021 Summer Deaflympics

References

External links
 Karate

2017 Summer Deaflympics
2017 in karate
International karate competitions hosted by Turkey